Greensleeves Rhythm Album #27: Diwali, also known as the Diwali Riddim, is an album and popular dancehall riddim that came to prominence in 2002. The riddim is credited to Jamaican producer Steven "Lenky" Marsden. This has appeared on several international hit songs by Sean Paul, Bounty Killer, Elephant Man, Lumidee, Brick & Lace (although their single "Love Is Wicked" was not released until 2007), and Wayne Wonder. The New York Times described the song as 'one of the most popular reggae rhythms of all time, spawning hits, sequels and -- inevitably -- rip-offs. If ever there was a beat that deserved its own Behind the Music, this is it.' Similarly, the album was heralded as 'the best reggae album' released in 2002.

It is recognized as arguably the most prominent and popular riddim of 2002 based on the number of top-ten hit songs that charted in Jamaica or internationally that used the instrumental, such as "Get Busy", "No Letting Go", "Never Leave You (Uh Oooh, Uh Oooh)", "Overcome", "Elephant Message", "Sufferer", "Party Time", and "Love Is Wicked". To this day, the riddim and the songs sampling it are still played on Jamaican radio stations every so often and is considered a classic.

The beat is characterized by syncopated clapping, and it was given the name Diwali for its Indian dance-music influence. The riddim has been featured in American television commercials via Sean Paul's song "Get Busy".

List of songs using Diwali Riddim

Charts

Weekly charts

Year-end charts

References

Riddims
2002 compilation albums
Reggae compilation albums
Greensleeves Records albums